Otanes (Old Persian: Utāna), son of Sisamnes, was an Achaemenid judge and later Satrap of Ionia during the reign of Darius the Great, circa 500 BC.

Career
Otanes first replaced his father as judge, when the latter was condemned for corruption by Cambyses II. He later took on military responsibilities under Darius, that led him to have an important role in suppressing the Ionian Revolt. In Histories 5 (Histories 5.25-5.28), Herodotus speaks of an Otanes - a son of a previously mentioned Sisamnes (3.31) - who served as a judge under Cambyses II and later under Darius I, who followed the European Scythian campaign of Darius I, and became governor in Asia Minor:

Ionian revolt

Otanes succeeded Megabazus as the governor/supreme commander of the united forces of the peoples of the Aegean (5.26.1), and  subjugated Byzantium and other cities during the Ionian revolt (5.123.1, 5.116.1).

According to Herodotus:

According to Herodotus, this Otanes also married one of Darius' daughters (5.116.1):

"Otanes" is a name given to several figures that appear in the Histories of Herodotus. One or more of these figures may be the same person.

References

Sources
 

Herodotus
6th-century BC Iranian people
Officials of Darius the Great
Achaemenid satraps of Ionia
Military leaders of the Achaemenid Empire
Ionian Revolt